The 2023 World Baseball Classic (WBC), an international professional baseball tournament, is the fifth iteration of the World Baseball Classic. It began on March 8 and will run until March 21. The United States is the defending champion.

It was originally scheduled to take place in 2021, four years after the previous event, but was canceled in May 2020 as a result of the COVID-19 pandemic. It was later announced that qualifications for the Classic would start in September 2022, as agreed by Major League Baseball (MLB) and the Major League Baseball Players Association (MLBPA). The tournament is being expanded from 16 to 20 national teams, with all teams that participated in the 2017 edition automatically qualifying, plus four additional spots.

Teams

Qualification

In January 2020, the WBC announced that the 16 national teams which participated at the 2017 World Baseball Classic would automatically qualify for the 2023 tournament.

A qualifying tournament was scheduled for March 2020 in Tucson, Arizona, United States, to determine the last four teams. Twelve teams were split into two pools, and the top two teams in each pool would qualify. On March 12, 2020, Major League Baseball announced that the qualifying tournaments were being postponed due to the COVID-19 pandemic. The qualification tournament ended up postponing to September 16–21, 2022, for the Africa/Europe qualifiers and September 30–October 5, 2022, for the Americas/Asia/Oceania qualifiers.

The Czech Republic, Great Britain, and Nicaragua made their first appearance in the World Baseball Classic, while Panama returned after having missed out on two World Baseball Classic appearances. This was the third consecutive time that South Africa, the only African team, did not qualify for the World Baseball Classic, and the second consecutive time that both Brazil and Spain did not qualify. With Panama qualified for the World Baseball Classic for the first time since 2009, South Africa now has the longest active WBC appearance drought at 14 years, having not qualified since 2009.

Draw

The pool draw was announced by Major League Baseball on July 7, 2022. Organizers prioritized placement in separate pools the four nations which reached the semifinals of the 2017 WBC (Japan, the Netherlands, Puerto Rico, and the United States) and the three hosts (Japan, the United States, and Taiwan). Remaining pool assignments were made based on WBSC World Rankings, competitive balance, and commercial and geographic interest.

Note: Numbers in parentheses indicate positions in the WBSC World Rankings at the time of the draw.

Venues
Four stadiums are being used during the main tournament.

Team base camps

Rosters

Participating nations had to submit their final 30-man rosters no later than February 7. WBC rules required teams to carry at least 14 pitchers and two catchers on their rosters.

Officiating

On March 7, Major League Baseball and the World Baseball Softball Confederation released the list of officials for the tournament.

Umpires

  Trent Thomas
  Chris Graham
  Stu Scheurwater
  Chan-Jung Chang
  Maikol Tibabijo
  Ángel Hernández
  Ramon De Jesus
  Felix Tejeda
  Serge Makouchetchev 
  Tim Meyer
  Fabrizio Fabrizi

  Shōji Arisumi
  Edwin Louisa
  Jairo Mendoza
  Alejandro Pecero
  Delfin Colon
  Roberto Ortiz
  Cuti Suárez
  Ki Taik Park
  Lance Barksdale
  Dan Bellino
  Cory Blaser

  Mark Carlson
  Laz Díaz
  Doug Eddings
  Mike Estabrook
  Andy Fletcher
  Chris Guccione
  Adam Hamari
  Pat Hoberg
  Dan Iassogna
  Ron Kulpa
  Nic Lentz

  Will Little 
  Ben May
  Bill Miller
  Alan Porter
  Chris Segal
  John Tumpane
  Quinn Wolcott
  Jhonatan Biarreta
  Carlos Torres

 Incorrectly listed as Ki Talk Park

Supervisors

  Mike Everitt
  Cris Jones
  Jeff Kellogg
  Larry Young

Prize money

The prize money allocation was released by Major League Baseball and the World Baseball Softball Confederation on March 7. Teams collect each stage they qualify in – the champions can collect a maximum of $3 million if they are a pool winner.

Group stage
Scheduled locations and dates are as follows:

Pool A

Pool A was contested in Taichung during March 8–12.

Pool B

Pool B was contested in Tokyo during March 9–13.

Pool C

Pool C was contested in Phoenix during March 11–15.

Pool D

Pool D was contested in Miami during March 11–15.

Knockout stage

The top two teams from each pool advanced to the single elimination bracket. These games are contested from March 15–21. Tokyo hosted two of the quarterfinals, while the other two quarterfinals, the semifinals, and the championship game will take place in Miami.

Bracket

Quarterfinals

Semifinals

Final

Statistical leaders

Batting

* Minimum 2.7 plate appearances per game

Pitching

* Minimum 0.8 innings pitched per game

Broadcasting rights

Notes

References

External links

Official website

 
World Baseball Classic
World Baseball Classic
World Baseball Classic
World Baseball Classic
World Baseball Classic
World Baseball Classic